This is a list of Dutch television related events from 1969.

Events
26 February - Lenny Kuhr is selected to represent Netherlands at the 1969 Eurovision Song Contest with her song "De troubadour". She is selected to be the fourteenth Dutch Eurovision entry during Nationaal Songfestival held at Circustheater in Scheveningen.
29 March - The Netherlands shares the win of the 14th Eurovision Song Contest, in a four-way tie with France, Spain and the United Kingdom. Lenny Kuhr represents the Netherlands, singing "De troubadour".

Debuts

Television shows

1950s
NOS Journaal (1956–present)
Pipo de Clown (1958-1980)

1960s
Stiefbeen en Zoon (1964-1971)

Ending this year

Births
24 April - Ruud de Wild, TV & radio presenter

Deaths